The Škoda 05 T, also known as Škoda Vektra (Velkokapacitní tramvaj (High-capacity tram)) was a five-carbody-section low-floor tram developed by Škoda Transportation and based on the Škoda 03 T.

The prototype was built in 2003 and by 2008 was in test service in Plzeň, being dismantled in 2009 shortly after. Newer Škoda trams (06 T, 10 T, 14 T, 16 T) are based on this type.

Production 
From 2003-2009, only one prototype was produced.

External links 
  Information about usage in Plzeň

Tram vehicles of the Czech Republic
Škoda trams

de:Škoda Elektra#Prototyp 05T „Vektra“